Abhishek Mohan Nair (born 8 October 1983) is a former Indian international cricketer. He is an all-rounder who bats left-handed and bowls right-arm medium pace. He played first class cricket for Mumbai and also represented Mumbai Indians, Kings XI Punjab, Pune Warriors India and Rajasthan Royals in the Indian Premier League. He played in his 100th first-class match in November 2018.

Domestic career
Nayar is a useful right-arm medium-pacer who has time and again got Mumbai crucial breakthrough in his young first-class career. He does not quite have the pace to be a regular attacking option but it's with his left-hand batting that he becomes a natural selection. 
Capable of crease occupation as well as hitting the ball hard, Nayar chipped in with vital contributions in Mumbai's successful Ranji Trophy campaign in 2006.

The first-class century narrowly eluded him for a time - he made 97 against Gujarat in 2006 but when it came it was a big one, 152 against Karachi Urban in the Mohammad Nissar Trophy.

Nayar was bought by the lucrative Indian Premier League's Mumbai franchise in early 2008 and enjoyed regular playing time as the tournament kicked off. In the final of the 2008/09 Ranji Trophy, he made a vital 99 that helped set up Mumbai's 38th triumph and, after being on the fringes of the national side.

He was the second highest run-scorer in the 2012/13 Ranji Trophy season scored 966 runs for Mumbai including three centuries and eight 50s. He also picked up 19 wickets to play an important role in the team's 40th Ranji Trophy title.

He selected to play for India A against Australia in a tour match in February. Nayar was not a part of the India A and Board President's XI squads which was announced earlier.
In 2013, Nayar sent down 10 wides and a no-ball in a 17-ball over in the semi-final of the inter-zone Deodhar Trophy. He equal record of Mohammad Sami holds the record in ODIs with his famous 17-ball over against Bangladesh in an Asia Cup match in 2004.
Nayar himself had handy figures of 7-0-49-2 with wickets of two specialist batsmen, Hanuma Vihari and CM Gautam. Nayar didn't look pleased with some of the wide calls, but later said it was more disappointment than dissent.
Nayar came into bowl in the 12th over of South Zone's innings and began with the wicket of opener Vihari first ball. The wide malaise began with the third delivery of the over.

Fifth, sixth, seventh, ninth, 11th, 12th, 13th, 14th and 15th were all wides. All bar one of those were off-side wides. Nayar even tried to shorten his run-up but to no avail.

He scored a century along with the Vijay Zol ensured India A held on for a draw against New Zealand "A" in Visakhapatnam on the final day in September 2013.

In Challenger Trophy 2013, he responded with a counterattacking 91 off 73 balls against Delhi as India Blues was reduced from 56 for 0 to 66 for 3. Against India Red, he scored unbeaten 75 off 39 balls as India Blues scored 345 runs in 50 overs.

After the 2018 IPL season, he was named as the mentor and head coach of the first-of-its-kind, KKR academy, to guide the youngsters of KKR during the off-season.

Ahead of the 2018–19 Ranji Trophy, he transferred from Mumbai to Puducherry. In November 2018, he played in his 100th first-class match.

International career.
He was named in India's squad for the ODI tour of the West Indies where he made his debut. In three matches, he played in one innings where he was not able to score a single run in the seven balls he faced and was nearly bowled. While bowling, he bowled three overs and gave away 17 runs without picking up any wickets.

Coaching career
He was appointed as assistant coach for Kolkata Knight Riders and  has been appointed the head coach of Trinbago Knight Riders

Personal life
Abhishek was born in Secunderabad to Keralite immigrants Mohan Nair and Lekha Nair. His parents were originally from Neyyattinkara in Kerala. He is one of the best players coming from Shivaji Park, Mumbai. He married Natasha Sheikh in 2014. Abhishek Nair shares good friendship with Rohit Sharma.

References

External links

Indian cricketers
India One Day International cricketers
1983 births
Mumbai Indians cricketers
Punjab Kings cricketers
Pune Warriors India cricketers
Mumbai cricketers
West Zone cricketers
India Green cricketers
India Blue cricketers
India Red cricketers
Brothers Union cricketers
Living people
Malayali people
People from Secunderabad
Cricketers from Hyderabad, India
Pondicherry cricketers